Aboubacar Sylla may refer to:

Sportspeople
Aboubacar Sylla (footballer, born 1983), Guinean international football striker
Aboubacar Sylla (footballer, born 1993), Guinean international football midfielder

Politicians
 Aboubacar Adama Sylla Guinean Deputy in the National Assembly of Guinea

See also
Abu Bakar Sillah (born 1989), Australian football defender